Bruno Lourenço Pinto de Almeida Paz (born 23 April 1998) is a Portuguese footballer who plays for Süper Lig club Konyaspor as a defensive midfielder.

Football career
On 6 August 2016, Paz made his professional debut with Sporting B in a 2016–17 LigaPro match against Portimonense.

Paz made his senior debut for Sporting CP in December 2018, when he was a 73rd-minute substitute in a 3-0 Europa League win over Vorskla Poltava.

On 23 May 2022, Paz signed a two-year contract (with one-year extension option) with Konyaspor in Turkey.

International career
Paz was born in Portugal to Angolan parents. He's a youth international for Portugal, having played up to the Portugal U20s. He was called up to the Angola national team for 2023 Africa Cup of Nations qualification matches in March 2023.

References

External links

Stats and profile at LPFP 
National team data 

1998 births
Sportspeople from Barreiro, Portugal
Living people
Portuguese footballers
Portugal youth international footballers
Portuguese sportspeople of Angolan descent
Association football defenders
Sporting CP footballers
Sporting CP B players
S.C. Farense players
Konyaspor footballers
Liga Portugal 2 players
Süper Lig players
Portuguese expatriate footballers
Expatriate footballers in Turkey
Portuguese expatriate sportspeople in Turkey